The Saurashtra Premier League (SPL) is a 20-over cricket league in Saurashtra, India. The league has been formed by Saurashtra Cricket Association. The first season of tournament was played between 14 and 22 May 2019. Sorath Lions won the first season while Halar Heroes won the second season.

Teams

Venue

All matches are played at Saurashtra Cricket Association (SCA) Stadium, Rajkot.

Winners
 2019 - Sorath Lions
 2022 - Halar Heroes

References

Cricket leagues in India
2019 establishments in Gujarat
Sports leagues established in 2019